The Bodil Award for Best Actor in a Leading Role is one of the merit categories presented annually by the Danish Film Critics Association at the Bodil Awards. Created in 1948, it is one of the oldest film awards in Europe, and it honours the best performance by an actor in a leading role in a Danish produced film. The jury can decide not to hand out the award. This has happened five times, in 1952, 1970, 1976, 1985, and in 1986.

Honorees

1940s 
 1948: Poul Reichhardt won for his role as the soldier Robert Olsen in Jenny and the Soldier
 1949: Mogens Wieth won for his role in Kampen mod uretten

1950s 
 1950: Erik Mørk won for his role in Susanne
 1951: Ib Schønberg won for his role in Café Paradis
 1952: Not awarded
 1953: Per Buckhøj won for his role in Adam and Eve
 1954:  won for his role in Hendes store aften
 1955: Emil Hass Christensen won for his role in Ordet
 1956: Ove Sprogøe won for his role in På tro og love
 1957: Peter Malberg won for his role in Be Dear to Me
 1958: Gunnar Lauring won for his role in Krudt og klunker
 1959: Preben Lerdorff Rye won for his role in

1960s 
 1960: Kjeld Petersen won for his role in Vi er allesammen tossede
 1961: Henning Moritzen won for his role in Forelsket i København
 1962: John Price won for his role in Duellen
 1963: Jarl Kulle won for his role in Den kære familie
 1964:  won for his role in Sekstet
 1965: Morten Grunwald won for his role in 
 1966: John Price won for his role in Neighbours
 1967: Per Oscarsson won for his role in Hunger
 1968: Jesper Langberg won for his role in 
 1969: Jesper Klein won for his role in Ballad of Carl-Henning

1970s 
 1970: Not awarded
 1971: Paul Scofield won for his role in King Lear
 1972: Ove Sprogøe won for his role in The Missing Clerk
 1973: Ole Ernst won for his role in 
 1974: Dirch Passer won for his role in Me and the Mafia
 1975: Ove Sprogøe won for his role in The Last Exploits of the Olsen Gang
 1976: Not awarded
 1977: Jens Okking won for his role in Strømer
 1978: Frits Helmuth won for his role in 
 1979: Jesper Christensen won for his role in

1980s 
 1980:  won for his role in Johnny Larsen
 1981: Buster Larsen won for his role in Jeppe på bjerget
 1982: Otto Brandenburg won for his role in 
 1983: Ole Ernst won for his role in Der er et yndigt land
 1984:  won for his role in 
 1985: Not awarded
 1986: Not awarded
 1987: Michael Falch won for his role in 
 1988: Max von Sydow won for his role in Pelle the Conqueror
 1989: Ole Lemmeke won for his role in

1990s 
 1990: Frits Helmuth won for his role in Waltzing Regitze
 1991: Tommy Kenter won for his role in Dance of the Polar Bears
 1992: Ole Lemmeke won for his role in 
 1993: Søren Østergaard won for his role in Pain of Love
 1994: Frits Helmuth won for his role in Stolen Spring
 1995: Ernst-Hugo Järegård won for his role as Stig Helmer in The Kingdom
 1996: Ulf Pilgaard won for his role in 
 1997: Max von Sydow won for his role in Hamsun
 1998: Holger Juul Hansen won for his role as Einar Moesgaard in Riget II
 1999: Ulrich Thomsen won for his role in The Celebration

2000s 
 2000:  won for his role as Lars Erik in Bornholms stemme
 2001: Jesper Christensen won for his role as Kaj in The Bench
 Jakob Cedergren was nominated for his role as Nick in Submarino
 Anders W. Berthelsen was nominated for his role as Andreas in Italian for Beginners
 Peter Gantzler was nominated for his role as Jørgen Mortensen in Italian for Beginners
 Thure Lindhardt was nominated for his role as Brian in A Place Nearby
 Søren Pilmark was nominated for his role as Thorkild in Flickering Lights
 2002: Jens Okking won for his role as Svensson in One-Hand Clapping
 Lars Mikkelsen was nominated for his role as Mads in Kira's Reason: A Love Story
 Troels Lyby was nominated for his role in Truly Human
 Nikolaj Lie Kaas was nominated for his role as P in Truly Human
 Sven Wollter was nominated for his role as Martin Fischer in A Song for Martin
 2003: Jens Albinus won for his role as Richard Malmros (as an adult) in Facing the Truth
 Ole Ernst was nominated for his role as Father in Okay
 Jørgen Kiil was nominated for his role in Minor Mishaps
 Mads Mikkelsen was nominated for his role as Niels in Open Hearts
 2004: Ulrich Thomsen won for his role as Christoffer in The Inheritance
 Lars Brygmann was nominated for his role in Reconstruction
 Jakob Cedergren was nominated for his role as Tom in Stealing Rembrandt
 Mads Mikkelsen was nominated for his role as Svend in The Green Butchers
 John Turturro was nominated for his role as Harry in Fear X
 2005: Mads Mikkelsen won for his role as Tonny in Pusher II
 Anders W. Berthelsen was nominated for his role as Ulrik Torp in King's Game
 Nikolaj Lie Kaas was nominated for his role as Jannik in Brothers
 Mikael Persbrandt was nominated for his role as Thomas in Day and Night
 Ulrich Thomsen was nominated for his role as Michael in Brothers
 2006: Jesper Christensen won for his role as Carsten in Manslaughter
 Mikael Persbrandt was nominated for his role as Åke in Bang Bang Orangutang
 Troels Lyby was nominated for his role as Henrik in Accused
 Thure Lindhardt was nominated for his role as Steso in Nordkraft
 Bjarne Henriksen was nominated for his role as Keld in Kinamand
 David Dencik was nominated for his role as Veronica in A Soap
 Rolf Lassgård was nominated for his role as Jørgen Lennart Hansson in After the Wedding
 Mads Mikkelsen was nominated for his role as Christoffer in Prague
  was nominated for his role as Frits Johansen in We Shall Overcome
 2008: Jesper Asholt won for his role as Father in The Art of Crying
 Kim Bodnia was nominated for his role as Simon in Echo
 Lars Brygmann was nominated for his role as Ulrich Nymann in 
 David Dencik was nominated for his role as Shmuli in 
 Thure Lindhardt was nominated for his role as Tosse Uffe in 
 2009: Jakob Cedergren won for his role as Robert Hansen in Terribly Happy
  was nominated for his role as Mogens in Gaven
 Thure Lindhardt was nominated for his role as Bent Faurschou Hviid in Flame & Citron
 Dar Salim was nominated for his role as Jamil in Go With Peace, Jamil
 Ulrich Thomsen was nominated for his role as Mikael in Fear Me Not

2010s 
 2010: Willem Dafoe won for his role as "He" in Amtichrist
 Kristian Halken was nominated for his role as Vagn Bendtsen in Oldboys
 Cyron Melville was nominated for his role as Pierre Duret in Love and Rage
 Nikolaj Coster-Waldau was nominated for his role as Claes Greve in Headhunters
 2011: Pilou Asbæk won for his role as R in R
 Jakob Cedergren was nominated for his role as Nick in Submarino
 David Dencik was nominated for his role as Jimmy in Brotherhood
 Mikael Persbrandt was nominated for his role as Anton in In a Better World
 Peter Plaugborg was nominated for his role as Nick's brother in Submarino
 2012: Nikolaj Lie Kaas won for his role as Dirch Passer in A Funny Man
 Jesper Christensen was nominated for his role as Rikard Rheinwald in A Family
 Anders W. Berthelsen was nominated for his role as Christian in SuperClásico
 2013: Mikkel Følsgaard won for his role as Christian VII in A Royal Affair
 Mads Mikkelsen was nominated for his role as Johann Friedrich Struensee in A Royal Affair
 Søren Malling was nominated for his role as Peter C. Ludvigsen in A Hijacking
 Pilou Asbæk was nominated for his role as Mikkel Hartmann in A Hijacking
 Lars Mikkelsen was nominated for his role as Per in A Caretaker's Tale
 2014: Mads Mikkelsen won for his role as Lucas in The Hunt
  was nominated for his role in Nordvest
 Jakob Cedergren was nominated for his role in Sorrow and Joy
 Nicolas Bro was nominated for his role as Mogens Glistrup in 
 Stellan Skarsgård was nominated for his role as Seligman in Nymphomaniac 
 2015:  won for his role as Kristian in Klumpfisken
 Mikael Persbrandt was nominated for his role as Thomas Jacob in Someone You Love
  was nominated for his role as Martin in Speed Walking
  was nominated for his role in The Other Life
 2016: Roland Møller won for his role as Sergeant Carl Leopold Rasmussen in Land of Mine
  was nominated for his role as Eik Skaløe in Itsi Bitsi
 Ulrich Thomsen was nominated for his role as Richard Møller Nielsen in Sommeren '92
 Pilou Asbæk was nominated for his role as Claus Michael Petersen in A War
 Peter Plaugborg was nominated for his role as Poul Brink in The Idealist
 2017: Søren Malling won for his role in Parents
 David Dencik was nominated for his role as Arne Itkin in 
 Mikkel Boe Følsgaard was nominated for his role as Thomas in Walk with Me
  was nominated for his role in 
 Ulrich Thomsen was nominated for his role as Erik in The Commune
 2018: Dejan Cukic won for his role in 
 : Jakob Cedergren won for his role as Asger Holm in The Guilty

2020s 
 : Jesper Christensen won for his role in Before the Frost
 : Mads Mikkelsen won for his role in Another Round

See also 

 Robert Award for Best Actor in a Leading Role

References

Sources

Further reading

External links 
  

1948 establishments in Denmark
Awards established in 1948
Actor in a leading role
Film awards for lead actor